The United Kingdom held a national preselection to choose the song that would go to the Eurovision Song Contest 1979. A Song for Europe 1979 was planned to take place at the Royal Albert Hall in London on 8 March.

Before Eurovision

A Song for Europe 1979
After a day's rehearsals at the Royal Albert Hall a strike by BBC technicians stopped the show about an hour before transmission. Audio recordings of the songs were voted on by 14 regional juries: Bristol, Bangor, Leeds, Norwich, Newcastle, Aberdeen, Birmingham, Belfast, Cardiff, Plymouth, Glasgow, Southampton and London. The jury in Manchester could not be contacted and since the winner had a more than 12 point winning margin, their scores were not included. This led to an immaterial tie for second place. The Manchester votes were later verified and added to the scores, demoting the song Call My Name down to third place. The following day, the 12 songs were broadcast on Terry Wogan's Radio 2 show and a recap of the top places, plus an interview with the winners took place on the BBC TV Show Nationwide the same evening.

Final

UK Discography 
Black Lace - Mary Ann: EMI EMI2919.
Lynda Virtu - You Are My Life: Mercury/Utopia TANGO7.
Ipswich - Who Put the Shine on Our Shoes?: Epic SEPC7195.
Herbie Flowers & the Daisies - Mr. Moonlight: EMI EMI2917.
M Squad - Miss Caroline Newley: Ariola ARO150.
Eleanor Keenan - Call My Name: CBS SCBS7198.
Roger Whittaker - Call My Name: Columbia DB9065.
Guys 'n' Dolls - How Do You Mend a Broken Heart?: Magnet MAG141.
Linda Kendrick - All I Needed Was Your Love: Epic SEPC7199.
Monte Carlo - Home Again (Living With You): EMI EMI2918.
Sal Davis - Let It All Go: Decca F13825.
The Nolan Sisters - Harry, My Honolulu Lover: Epic SEPC7197.
Kim Clark - Fantasy: CBS SCBS7196.
Only the winning song reached the UK singles chart.

At Eurovision
Black Lace were the winners of A Song for Europe with "Mary Ann" and went on to place 7th at the 1979 Eurovision Song Contest in Jerusalem.

This was also the only Eurovision between 1972 and 2008 in which Terry Wogan did not provide either the television or radio commentary. Wogan had originally been scheduled to provide the television commentary but opted out of going to Israel following comments he made of the 1978 winner "A-Ba-Ni-Bi" sounding like "I Wanna Be a Polar Bear". Instead his Radio 2 colleague John Dunn provided the television commentary. Ray Moore provided the radio commentary on both BBC Radio 1 and Radio 2.

Voting

References

External links
UK National Final 1979

1979
Countries in the Eurovision Song Contest 1979
Eurovision
Eurovision